The Africa Zone was one of the four zones within Group 3 of the regional Davis Cup competition in 2016. The zone's competition was held in round robin format in Antananarivo, Madagascar, in July 2016. Two nations won promotion to Group II, Europe/Africa Zone, for 2017.

Participating nations

Inactive nations

Draw
Date: 11–16 July 2016

Location: Antananarivo University, Antananarivo, Madagascar (clay)

Format: Round-robin basis. Four pools of five teams (Pools A and B). The winners of each pool play-off against the runners-up of the other pool to determine which two nations are promoted to Europe/Africa Zone Group II in 2017.

Seeding: The seeding was based on the Davis Cup Rankings of 7 March 2016 (shown in parentheses below).

{| class="wikitable"
!width=20%|Pot 1
!width=20%|Pot 2
!width=20%|Pot 3
!width=20%|Pot 4
!width=20%|Pot 5
|-
|
  (68)
  (80)
|
  (83)
  (84) 
|
  (101)
  (105)
|
  (113)
 (119)
|
  (122)
  (127)
|}

Group A

Group B

First round

Group A

Morocco vs. Mozambique

Namibia vs. Nigeria

Morocco vs. Namibia

Mozambique vs. Cameroon

Namibia vs. Cameroon

Morocco vs. Nigeria

Namibia vs. Mozambique

Nigeria vs. Cameroon

Mozambique vs. Nigeria

Morocco vs. Cameroon

Group B

Algeria vs. Madagascar

Benin vs. Botswana

Algeria vs. Benin

Madagascar vs. Kenya

Algeria vs. Botswana

Benin vs. Kenya

Benin vs. Madagascar

Botswana vs. Kenya

Madagascar vs. Botswana

Algeria vs. Kenya

Play-offs

Promotional

Morocco vs. Benin

Namibia vs. Madagascar

5th−6th

Nigeria vs. Kenya

7th−8th

Cameroon vs. Algeria

9th−10th

Mozambique vs. Botswana

References

Official Website

Africa Zone Group III
Davis Cup Europe/Africa Zone